Troxocoptes is a genus of mites in the family Acaridae.

Species
 Troxocoptes minutus Fain & J. R. Philips, 1983

References

Acaridae